Woods v. Cloyd W. Miller Co., 333 U.S. 138 (1948), was a case in which the Supreme Court of the United States held that the war powers of the United States Congress extend beyond the end of hostilities allowing them to remedy problems caused by a war after it has ended.

Congress passed a law limiting rents in certain areas for the purposes of controlling a deficit of housing due to returning veterans which took effect July 1, 1947.  The following day a landlord demanded increased rent in a covered area of Cleveland.  Hostilities in World War II had been terminated by presidential proclamation on December 31, 1946. 

The Supreme Court found the law valid under the Necessary and Proper and War Powers clauses of the Constitution.  The Court held, "Congress has the power even after the cessation of hostilities to act to control the forces that a short supply of the needed article created." It indicated the legislative history revealed Congress intended to use its war powers and the war was a "direct and immediate" cause of the problem.  The Court recognized the effects of a war may continue for years and that there might be a point at which the power to legislate to remedy effects of war would violate the Ninth and Tenth Amendments. Such concerns were not a part of this case.

References

External links
 
 

United States Supreme Court cases
United States Supreme Court cases of the Vinson Court
1948 in United States case law
History of Cleveland